Osbourn Park High School is a Prince William County, Virginia public high school in a small county island between the cities of Manassas and Manassas Park, southwest of Washington D.C.

Osbourn Park serves the mid-part of the county. The community consists of business, professional, U.S. Government and military residents.  Osbourn Park has also been designated as The Biotechnology Center and houses two other unique programs: Allied Health and NJROTC. It has at various times had a student population ranging from 1900 to 3200, but it is currently around 2500 grades 9-12.

History

Osbourn High School opened in 1931. In the 1940s, a new school was constructed on county property lying between the towns of Manassas and Manassas Park.  By 1977, both towns had become independent cities with their own high schools.  The new school became Osbourn Park High School and the new Osbourn High School was opened and used by the City of Manassas while the City of Manassas Park built a Manassas Park High School.

Demographics
In the 2017–2018 school year, Osbourn Park's student body was:
16.7% Black/African American
28.5% Hispanic 
34.1% White
14.7% Asian
5.3% Two or More Races
.5% American Indian/Alaskan
.4% Hawaiian/Pacific Islander

Curriculum
Osbourn Park offers the Biotechnology program. It is a four-year program for students interested in Science, Technology, Engineering and Mathematics (STEM) related fields. The Biotechnology Program allows students to enroll in a variety of Advanced Placement (AP) science courses. Osbourn Park High School recently purchased class sets of iPads. Osbourn Park also offers specialty programs through their automotive program, firefighting program, Navy JROTC, practical nursing program, project lead-the-way, and the pre-governors school program.

Extra-Curricular activities
Osbourn Park has a variety of clubs and activities.  A list of the clubs includes: Amnesty International, Key Club, Choir, Band, Orchestra, Drama, InterAct Club, Future Educators of America (FEA), Fellowship of Christian Athletes, Forensics, Debate, Yearbook, Scholastic Bowl (It's Academic), National Honors Society, French Honor Society, Spanish Honor Society, Student Government, Peer Mediators, Robotics Team, Leadership, Marching Band, Model United Nations, Table Tennis Club, DECA, OP Idol, The International Heritage Society, Step Team, robotics, and NJROTC. They also have an anime club, game club and girls who code club.

Architecture
Osbourn Park was a classic school of the 1970s, constructed with open, modular classrooms.  Renovations began in 2005 to update the nearly thirty-year-old interior of the building. Some of the changes include permanent walls for classrooms including doors, new floors, and newly painted walls. These renovations were completed by the end of the 2006–2007 school year.  Unity Reed High School, another county high school constructed around the same time, is an exact replica of Osbourn Park.  Both schools have a red brick facade. In the summer of 2022, renovations were made to add more windows to the front of the school building.

Athletics
The mascot is a yellow jacket and the sports teams currently play in the 6A Classification in Cedar Run Conference and 6A North Region. Osbourn Park's athletics stadium is named after Al Crow. Their athletics field is named after Larry Nemerow, a former soccer coach at Osbourn Park who coached for 23 successful years.

Media
Osbourn Park High School offers a student produced newspaper titled, The Yellow Jacket.

The student produced yearbook is titled The Hi-Jacket and is under the supervision of the school.

Live from the Hive (a misnomer because yellow jackets live in nests instead of hives), the first student produced news program debuted in the 2007–2008 school year. The news episodes are an average of five minutes long and are broadcast to the entire school. There were nine episodes in the first season. The episodes focus on recent news, sports and upcoming information about the school.

The first producer was Michelle Pecore (2007–2008), followed by 
Julia Hosick(2008–2009). Live From the Hive has not filmed since then.
Mr. Jason Shaw was the advisor for the Yellow Jacket and Live from the Hive.

Notable alumni

 David Robinson, Class of 1983, Basketball Hall of Fame player (center, San Antonio Spurs), alumnus of the United States Naval Academy, nicknamed "The Admiral".
 Leeann Tweeden, Class of 1991 (graduated in 3 years), model (Playboy, Frederick's of Hollywood, Hooters, Venus Swimwear) and TV personality (ESPN2, Fox Sports Network).
 Andrew Dykstra, Class of 2004, D.C. United Goalkeeper
 Travis Tucker, Class of 2001, semi-finalist on American Idol Season 4.
 Julie Croteau, Class of 1988, first woman to play men's NCAA baseball, and first woman to coach men's NCAA Division I baseball.
 Jason Richardson, Class of 2009, current musician for All That Remains and solo project, former band Chelsea Grin and Born of Osiris
 Nico Greetham, Class of 2013, Season 10 finalist of So You Think You Can Dance, actor seen in American Horror Story, The Prom and Love, Victor.

See also
 Prince William County Public Schools

References

Educational institutions established in 1976
Public high schools in Virginia
Northern Virginia Scholastic Hockey League teams
Schools in Prince William County, Virginia
1976 establishments in Virginia